The India women's cricket team toured New Zealand in February 2022. The tour consisted of five Women's One Day Internationals (WODIs) and one Women's Twenty20 International (WT20I). The WODI matches were used as preparation for the 2022 Women's Cricket World Cup, also taking place in New Zealand.

The initial tour schedule had matches in North New Zealand. However on 27 January 2022, New Zealand Cricket announced a change to the itinerary, with all the matches being held at the John Davies Oval.

New Zealand won the one-off WT20I match by 18 runs following an all-round performance from Lea Tahuhu. New Zealand won the first WODI match by 62 runs after Suzie Bates scored a century. As part of New Zealand's "contingency planning" for the Women's Cricket World Cup, Amy Satterthwaite captained the team for the second WODI match. New Zealand went on to win the match by three wickets, with Amelia Kerr scoring an unbeaten 119 runs. New Zealand won the third match by three wickets, winning the series with two matches to play. It was India's tenth consecutive loss in WODIs after batting first.

The fourth WODI match was reduced to 20 overs per side due to rain. New Zealand won the match by 63 runs, following another all-round performance from Amelia Kerr. India won the fifth and final WODI match by six wickets, with New Zealand winning the series 4–1.

Squads

India's Smriti Mandhana, Meghna Singh and Renuka Singh missed the WT20I match and the opening WODI fixture due to being in managed isolation and quarantine (MIQ) in New Zealand. As a result, Sabbhineni Meghana was added to India's WODI squad, after previously only being named in their WT20I squad. Simran Bahadur was also added to India's WODI squad, making her debut in the second match. Following the conclusion of the second WODI, Smriti Mandhana, Meghna Singh and Renuka Singh were all out of quarantine and available to play in the remaining matches. Ekta Bisht was added to India's squad for the third WODI. Brooke Halliday was ruled out of New Zealand's squad for the last two WODI matches, after being deemed a close contact to someone with COVID-19.

Only WT20I

WODI series

1st WODI

2nd WODI

3rd WODI

4th WODI

5th WODI

Notes

References

External links
 Series home at ESPN Cricinfo

India 2021–22
New Zealand 2021–22
International cricket competitions in 2021–22
2022 in New Zealand cricket
2022 in Indian cricket
2022 in women's cricket